Seyed Hadi Aghily (born 15 January 1981) is a former Iranian professional footballer who played as a centre-back. Known for his toughness, positioning and intelligent movement, he was nominated for the Asian Player of The Year award twice in 2009 and 2011.

Aghily began his career at Saipa, then moved to Sepahan and reached the 2007 AFC Champions League Final. He spent two successful seasons in Qatar with Al-Arabi and Qatar SC, before returning to Sepahan and concluding his football career in 2016.

He captained the Iranian national team on multiple occasions.

Club career

Early years
Aghily was born in Tehran. He was part of the Persepolis youth academy, but left for Saipa in 2001.

Sepahan
After three years at Saipa, he moved to Sepahan where he won the Hazfi Cup and also played in the AFC Champions League final in 2007. He also played in the 2007 FIFA Club World Cup. After his good games, he was linked with a move to Japanese teams and also with a return to Persepolis, but he decided to extend his contract with Sepahan. He had so many injuries during the 2008–09 season that he did not play many matches for Sepahan and missed some of the matches of the 2010 FIFA World Cup qualification for Team Melli.

On 28 July 2009, Aghili traveled to Freiburg in order to negotiate a future move to the Bundesliga side. However, negotiations were cut short after a few days and the club released a statement saying that "Hadi was not the player that they were looking for." He won the league with Sepahan twice in a row. He left Sepahan in the summer of 2011 after seven seasons.

Qatar Stars League
In July 2011, Aghili signed a new contract with Al-Arabi. He wears the number 55 and was the club's captain. He won the Sheikh Jassem Cup while with the club. There were rumors that he would join Persepolis after the Iran Pro League season had finished, but he signed with Qatar SC on 22 June 2012, remaining in Qatar Stars League for another season. He played many matches for the team.

Return to Sepahan
On 19 June 2013, after spending two seasons in Qatar, he returned to his former club, Sepahan. He officially rejoined the club on 1 July 2013, signing a two-year contract. He made his debut in a 2–0 win over Foolad and scored his first goal in the next match from penalty kicks in a 2–1 away win against Esteghlal. He was also the captain of Sepahan for their match with Esteghlal, as Moharram Navidkia did not play because of injury. On 9 June 2014, Aghily extended his contract with Sepahan until 30 June 2017.

International career

In October 2006, he was called up to the Iranian national team for the 2006 LG Cup held in Jordan. He made his debut for Iran on 4 October 2006 in a match against Iraq.

He was an important member of the Iranian squad at various major tournaments, such as the 2007 and 2011 AFC Asian Cups, the 2008 and 2010 WAFF Championships, as well as the 2010 and 2014 FIFA World Cup qualification phases.

Retirement
Prior to a 2014 World Cup qualifying match against Lebanon, Aghily left the team camp because he knew he would not be in the starting lineup. He was banned for one year and Carlos Queiroz left him out of the team. Before the last three World Cup qualifying matches in June 2013, he publicly apologised to Queiroz and Iranian fans but was still not called up. In July 2013, he revealed that the Iranian FA and Queiroz wanted him to sign an apology letter, but Mehdi Rahmati advised him not to as he believed that Iran would lose the first match and would then beg him to return.

Career statistics

Club
Last updated on 10 December 2016.

International goals
Scores and results list Iran's goal tally first.

Honours

Sepahan
Iran Pro League: 2009–10, 2010–11, 2014–15
Hazfi Cup: 2005–06, 2006–07
AFC Champions League Runner-up: 2007

Al-Arabi
Sheikh Jassem Cup: 2011

Iran
WAFF Championship: 2008

Individual
Asian Footballer of the Year Fourth place: 2009
Asian Footballer of the Year Runner-up: 2011

References

1981 births
Living people
Sportspeople from Tehran
Iranian footballers
Iran international footballers
Association football defenders
Saipa F.C. players
Sepahan S.C. footballers
Persepolis F.C. players
Al-Arabi SC (Qatar) players
Qatar SC players
Persian Gulf Pro League players
Qatar Stars League players
2007 AFC Asian Cup players
2011 AFC Asian Cup players
Iranian expatriate footballers
Expatriate footballers in Qatar